The 2018–19 Rugby Europe Trophy is the second-level rugby union competition below the premier Championship. It is the third Trophy competition under its new format, that will see Czech Republic, Lithuania, Netherlands, Poland, and Switzerland compete for the title, and a place in the Championship-Trophy promotion play-off.

This year's competition sees Lithuania joining the Trophy after winning the Trophy-Conference 1 promotion play-off against Malta. After the Championship-Trophy promotion play-off of the 2017-18 season, which was played on 3 November 2018 between Portugal and Romania after the eligibility case of the 2018 Rugby Europe Championship, Portugal remained on the Trophy level and lost the relegation play-off for the second year in a row.

Table

Fixtures 

Notes:

Notes:

Notes:

Relegation/Promotion play-off

Top scorers

Top points scorers

Top try scorers

See also 
 Rugby Europe International Championships
 2018–19 Rugby Europe International Championships
 Six Nations Championship
 Antim Cup

References

External links
 Rugby Europe official website

2018–19 Rugby Europe International Championships
2018-19